Léon Londot (22/02/1876-15/06/1953), son of Emile Londot and Adolphine Auquier, was a Belgian painter and artist. His brother, Charles Londot (01/08/1886 - 1968) was also a painter and artist. 

He was a private teacher of Queen Elisabeth of Belgium.

Honours 
 1932 : Commander in the Order of Leopold.

References

Belgian painters
1876 births
1953 deaths